Hempton Priory was a medieval monastery at Hempton in Norfolk, England,  variously referred to also as Fakenham or Damsend Priory.

Of the buildings of the medieval institution very few surface remains can be seen, although substantial earthworks are evident and the foundations of a long building have been noted as incorporated into a later building.

History
During the reign of Henry I,  before 1135,  the house was founded as a hospital by Roger de St Martin (St Martins), lord of the manor of Hempton, with Richard Ward. The latter assumed the role of the first prior when the hospital became a priory of the Augustinian Canons Regular.

King John granted  Hempton Priory rights to hold a fair, later rising to three fairs a year.  The prior claimed a market on Tuesday, which was noted as being long obsolete in White's Directory of 1854.  The net income from its estates in 1535 was £32 14s. 8d.

The priory continued to be used as a hospital after 1200. It was seized by the crown in 1536,  the land being granted to Sir William Fermer in 1545/6.  The land subsequently became the property of Viscount Towsnhend.

Priors
 1165-1166, Simon was prior in the 12th year of Henry II 
 1269-1270, Richard occurs as prior, in the 54th  year of Henry III 
 Guy Ferret
 In 1301, Richard de Westacre, was admitted as prior.
 Alan de Lenn
 1339, Nicholas de Kettleston 
 1386, John de Snoring
 1393, John Pencthorp
 1402-1403, John occurs as prior in the 4th  year of Henry IV 
 John occurs as prior, about the 15th.
 1438-1439, 1449-1450, Richard occurs as prior in the 17th and the 28th  years  of Henry VI  
 1451, Stephen Wighton, a canon of Westacre, elected prior in 1451, and confirmed by the Bishop on 2 October
 1481, John de Lexham, alias Penton, occurs then as prior in 1504.
 William Fakenham
 1529-1530, John Sambrook occurs as prior in the 21st year of Henry VIII  
 In 1534, Henry Salter occurs as prior.

Priory seal
The seal of the priory was oblong in shape, of red wax, showing an image of St Stephen standing under an arch between two tapers, with the legend 'SIGILLUM COMMUNE SANCTI STEPHANI DE HEMPTON'.  Under this was the image of a figure kneeling under an arch.

References

Monasteries in Norfolk
12th-century establishments in England
Christian monasteries established in the 12th century
1536 disestablishments in England
Augustinian monasteries in England